Saint Lupicinus (c. 486) (also known as Lupicinus of Condat) was an Abbot. His brother was Saint Romanus of Condat. St. Lupicinus is noted for founding the abbeys of Saint-Claude in the Jura mountains and in the Lauconne districts of France. His feast day is March 21.

This Saint Lupicinus is not to be confused with Saint Lupicinus of Lipidiaco (Gaul) (died 500).

References

The Life of the Jura Fathers: The Life and Rule of the Holy Fathers Romanus, Lupicinus, and Eugendus, Abbots of the Monasteries in the Jura Mountains, Trans. by Tim Vivian, Kim Vivian, and Jeffrey Burton Russell, (Spencer, Mass.: Cistercian Publications, 1999).

Year of birth unknown
480s deaths
French abbots
5th-century Christian saints